Evolva is a third-person action game created by British computer artist William Latham and game designer/programmer Mark Atkinson, and released in 2000.

Gameplay
The player leads a team of four "GenoHunters" exploring a planet; each of the GenoHunters can develop new abilities by incorporating and altering the DNA they've absorbed from the creatures they have killed. The GenoHunters change their physical appearance (change colors, develop spikes or horns) based on the DNA they've used to mutate themselves. Genohunters can punch, jump, super jump, breathe fire, vomit flammable liquids, shoot explosives, scramble enemies' brains, and spawn small alien offspring that injure enemies. Prior to the game's release, publisher Interplay Entertainment advertised that there are over one billion possible variations on the basic Genohunter.

The game has 12 large, linear levels populated with alien insect-like creatures known as the "parasite guardians". There are different types of these alien creatures. In some of the levels there are "Bosses" at the end which your team of GenoHunters must defeat.

Reception

The game received favorable reviews according to the review aggregation website GameRankings. The game was praised by critics as very innovative, without any major criticisms, other than the high hardware requirements (for the time) and weak multiplayer support. Jim Preston of NextGen said of the game, "The gorgeous graphics and beautiful sound conceal some rather ordinary, if mostly fun, gameplay."

Nick Woods of AllGame gave it a score of four stars out of five, saying, "A strong point of Evolva is the quality of the environments created by Interplay. The sense that you're on another planet is apparent and adds to the enjoyment of the game. I'd recommend this game to just about anyone as, overall, Evolva is a good, solid game that will provide many hours of enjoyment." Michael Lafferty of GameZone gave it 8.5/10, calling it "a well-designed action-adventure game that demands intellect and reflexive skill."

References

External links

2000 video games
Action video games
Biopunk
Interplay Entertainment games
Multiplayer and single-player video games
Video games about extraterrestrial life
Video games set on fictional planets
Virgin Interactive games
Windows games
Windows-only games
Video games developed in the United Kingdom